Lucas James Rumball (born 2 August 1995) is a Canadian rugby union player who generally plays as a back-row represents Canada internationally and also currently plays for Canadian club Toronto Arrows in Major League Rugby (MLR).

He was included in the Canadian squad for the 2019 Rugby World Cup which is held in Japan for the first time and also marks his first World Cup appearance.

Career 
He made his international debut for Canada against Uruguay on 6 February 2016. He made his first World Cup match appearance against Italy on 26 September 2019 in Canada's opening match of the tournament in Pool B. The match ended up in a losing cause for Canada, where Italy thrashed them in a one sided contest by scoring 48–7.

Club statistics

References 

1995 births
Living people
Canadian rugby union players
Canada international rugby union players
Sportspeople from Markham, Ontario
Rugby union flankers
Rugby union number eights
Toronto Arrows players